Nicolette Rianne Staudt-Kluijver (born 29 September 1984) is a Dutch television presenter and former model.  she works for RTL 5 (presenting the nude dating show, Adam Zkt. Eva), after spending many years at BNN.

When she was 17, she was discovered by a modelling agency and she worked for Diesel (brand), Tommy Hilfiger and G-Star After three years, she auditioned for 6pack, a Dutch television program, which she hosted two years.

In 2006, she joined the Dutch broadcasting company BNN, co-presenting the program Spuiten en Slikken in which Dutch celebrities are interviewed about drug use and sexual practices. She is one of the eight presenters of Try Before You Die.

Programs
As presenter

 SBS / MTV: 6pack Season 4 and 5
 BNN: Try Before You Die Season 3,4 and 5 (Since 2007)
 BNN: Spuiten and Slikken Season 3,4,5,6,7,8 and 9 (Since 2006)
 BNN: Spuiten and Slikken Travel
 BNN: Spuiten and Slikken Summertour (2008 en 2009)
 BNN: Main Host: Spuiten and Slikken (Since Nov. 2009)
 RTL 4: Een goed stel hersens

As candidate/guest
 Ranking the Stars (Nederland) 2008
 JENSEN! 2007 en 2008
 Wie is... de Mol? 2008
 Waar is de Mol? 2009 - with host Johnny de Mol to Indonesia. (Season 3,ep.3)

References

External links

 

1984 births
Living people
Dutch female models
Dutch television presenters
People from Hilversum
Writers from Amsterdam
Dutch women television presenters
21st-century Dutch women